Masakichi is a masculine Japanese given name. Notable people with the name include:

, Japanese sculptor
, Japanese general

See also
5822 Masakichi, a main-belt asteroid

Japanese masculine given names